Brooklet is a city in Bulloch County, Georgia, United States. As of the 2020 census, the city had a population of 1,704.

It is the home of the Southeast Bulloch School system. It is located along US Highway 80.

The Georgia General Assembly incorporated Brooklet as a town in 1906.

Geography
Brooklet is located at  (32.382175, -81.664695).

Demographics

2020 census

As of the 2020 United States census, there were 1,704 people, 699 households, and 492 families residing in the city.

2000 census
As of the census of 2000, there were 1,113 people, 422 households, and 302 families residing in the town. The racial makeup of the town was 79.96% White, 19.59% African American, 0.09% Native American, 0.36% from other races. Hispanic or Latino of any race were 1.44% of the population.

There were 422 households, out of which 33.4% had children under the age of 18 living with them, 59.5% were married couples living together, 11.8% had a female householder with no husband present, and 28.2% were non-families. 23.9% of all households were made up of individuals, and 10.9% had someone living alone who was 65 years of age or older.  The average household size was 2.64 and the average family size was 3.16.

In the town the population was spread out, with 26.2% under the age of 18, 8.8% from 18 to 24, 28.2% from 25 to 44, 21.3% from 45 to 64, and 15.5% who were 65 years of age or older.  The median age was 36 years. For every 100 females, there were 84.6 males.  For every 100 females age 18 and over, there were 83.7 males.

The median income for a household in the town was $34,438, and the median income for a family was $39,250. Males had a median income of $30,972 versus $21,667 for females. The per capita income for the town was $16,793.  About 6.9% of families and 10.7% of the population were below the poverty line, including 8.4% of those under age 18 and 17.7% of those age 65 or over.

Peanut Festival
The Brooklet Peanut Festival is an annual festival that occurs on the third Saturday of September.

The first festival was held in 1990. It drew about 2,000 people and helped finance a town park lined with benches around a gazebo and fountain. The park was dedicated to the Town of Brooklet at the 6th Annual Peanut Festival in 1995. The Brooklet Peanut Festival consists of an annual parade, a beauty pageant, a Peanut Run, booths, entertainment, and a tractor race.  Each year, the festival has grown in attendance.

The parade follows an approximately  route with participation from local schools, organizations and businesses. The beauty pageant has many age groups, including 0–6 months, 7–18 months, 9–35 months, 3–4 years, 5–6 years, 7–9 years, 10–12 years, 13–15 years, 16 years and over. The contestant who wins in the 16 and over category is crowned Miss Peanut Queen.

The Brooklet Peanut Run is a 5K race that occurs around 7 am on the day of the Peanut Festival. The race begins and ends at Brooklet Elementary School. There are approximately 300 participants in the race each year.

The festival has live, free entertainment. Performers have included the Southern Dance Academy, Southeast Bulloch High School band, and many local bands.

The slow tractor race is an annual race where tractors race as slowly as possible. The last tractor to cross the finish line is the winner. The Kiddie Pedal Tractor race is designed for children who race a pint-sized tractor.

Notable people
Cecil B. Day, founder of Days Inn hotels.
Jan Tankersley, member of the Georgia House of Representatives and former member of the Brooklet City Council.

References

External links
Brooklet Peanut Festival
Brooklet, Georgia historical marker

Cities in Bulloch County, Georgia
Cities in Georgia (U.S. state)